"Cook Like A Pro" is a show by Ina Garten. The show is a continuation of her show Barefoot Contessa. It is focused on chef skills and will feature celebrity guests. It begins airing on May 28, 2017.

References 

2017 American television series debuts
2010s American cooking television series
Bravo (American TV network) original programming